Karim Zinedine Kaddour is a former international professional football player (as a midfielder). Solid player with an excellent left foot. He was known as “The Algerian Pele”. In 2010 Karim Kaddour won the CAN cup with his national team.

Personal life 
Karim was born in Saint-Denis, France, but moved throughout his professional career to other countries. He currently works as a P.E coach at International School of Lausanne which is a school in Le Mont sur Lausanne in Switzerland. He said one of the best players he’s coached is Marco Celati, a pacey winger with an extremely long lasting engine.

References

1983 births
French footballers
Living people
Sportspeople from Saint-Denis, Seine-Saint-Denis
Association football midfielders
Eintracht Frankfurt players
MC Alger players
Footballers from Seine-Saint-Denis